Snowball is the debut album by England twee pop group The Field Mice. It was originally released as a 10" vinyl LP on September 4, 1989 through Sarah Records.

Track listing
 "Let's Kiss and Make Up" – 6:13
 "You're Kidding Aren't You" – 2:30
 "End of the Affair" – 4:14
 "Couldn't Feel Safer" – 3:47
 "This Love Is Not Wrong" – 3:21
 "Everything About You" – 2:30
 "White" – 4:17
 "Letting Go" – 6:33

2005 bonus tracks 
The following tracks appear on the 2005 reissue of the album from LTM recordings.
 "Sensitive"
 "When Morning Comes to Town"
 "Emma's House"
 "When You Sleep"
 "Fabulous Friend"
 "The Last Letter"
 "I Can See Myself Alone Forever"
 "Everything About You" (alternate version)
 "That's All This Is"

1989 debut albums
Sarah Records albums
The Field Mice albums
Jangle pop albums